The BMW E70 is the second-generation BMW X5 mid-size luxury crossover SUV. It replaced the BMW X5 (E53) in July 2006. It was manufactured alongside the BMW X6 at BMW's Greer, South Carolina plant in the U.S. and BMW's facility in Toluca, Mexico.

Design

Technology

The xDrive AWD system updates previewed in the facelifted X5 have continued with further detail improvements for the E70. It uses a double wishbone suspension at the front. The manual transmission is entirely dropped, leaving only the automatic transmission.

The E70 features many new technological advancements for this class as standard equipment including BMW's iDrive system, electronic 'joystick' gearshift (no mechanical connection to the gearbox to save space in the console), LED taillamps, the first ever all-polypropylene single module fender module, and options such as heads-up display (HUD), active steering, active damping, and Dynamic Drive which uses active anti-roll bars employing a hydraulic servo in the middle to actively counteract body roll. The X5 has a rollover risk of 17.4%.

The interior of the X5 is completely new. It has a large center-mounted display screen and the simplified iDrive, a man-machine interface system also found in the rest of the BMW model range. The E70 further incorporates many comfort options such as a glass panorama-roof, and, for the first time in a BMW, an optional third row seat which has increased the seating capacity in E70 to 7 passengers, addressing criticism of the E53 model which had been regarded as being slightly too small for this market segment.

The E70 is also the first production vehicle to use FlexRay, a new extremely fast electrical bus system; it is only used for the control of the chassis damping system.  The new 'joy-stick'-style electronic space-saving shifter has since been adopted in the new 2008 BMW 5 Series.

For the 2010 model year the X5 received the new iDrive system and the BMW individual audio system along with various other minor updates.

Technical features which other BMW models use also:

 Active steering- changes the steering ratio depending on the speed and driving style
Adaptive Drive with Active Roll Stabilization and adaptive shock absorbers
 Head-up display - critical information projected onto the windshield
Comfort Access - keyless access and engine start
 Daytime running lights on the "Corona Rings" around the main headlight units
 Four-zone climate control

New is the Park Distance system that can be integrated into the image of the optional rearview camera.

During the Volkswagen emissions violations, an X5 diesel was used as an example of a compliant vehicle.

BMW X5 M (2009-13)

The BMW X5 M is a high-performance derivative of the X5. It was introduced to the press at the New York Auto Show in April 2009 and started appearing in BMW dealerships in September 2009. It competes with cars such as the Mercedes-Benz ML63 AMG, the Porsche Cayenne Turbo S, and the Jeep Grand Cherokee SRT8.  At the time of its launch, it was the most powerful car in its class.

The S63 engine is a high output variation of the N63 power unit.

In the same test, the X5 M bested the 0– and quarter-mile times of the 2009 Porsche Cayenne Turbo S, the 2009 Jeep Grand Cherokee SRT-8, and the 2010 Range Rover Sport Supercharged. In wet conditions, the X5 M went around the Top Gear Test Track in 1:28.2, 5.1 seconds faster than the Audi Q7 V12 TDI.

Coupled with special suspension specifically optimized for M that features Adaptive Drive and the newly developed M Servotronic power steering, the performance Sport Activity Vehicle promises very competent handling. Other high-tech features include launch control for maximum acceleration and a six-speed M Sport automatic transmission optimized for performance. Drivers can manually select gears using either paddles or an electronic gear selector lever. Electronically controlled, variable power distribution to the front and rear axle prevents the tendency to oversteer or understeer, before DSC Dynamic Stability Control is required to cut in.

The BMW X5 M features the biggest brakes on a BMW production vehicle, with 15.55" (395x36mm) rotors up front clamped by four-piston calipers, and 15.2" (385x24mm) rotors at the rear with single-piston calipers. Although traction control is standard, the M Dynamic Mode (MDM) reduces the effect of the system, allowing some wheelspin and drift-type cornering.

For the 2013 model lineup, BMW introduced the M Performance Package available for the xDrive35i and xDrive50i. The M Performance Package models have nearly identical features to the X5 M (sport suspension, wider fenders, staggered wheels, etc.) excluding the quad-tip exhaust, headlights, and engines.

M Performance Parts were available for the X5 M. These include black kidney grilles, steel pedals, a sport steering wheel and M rims.

Model lineup

Engines

Petrol engines

Diesel engines

Since 2008, vehicles sold with diesel engines in the United States are equipped with selective catalysator using Diesel exhaust fluid (DEF) to reduce NOx emissions, while vehicles sold in Europe had a bypass exhaust pipe only due the regulations which ended up in Dieselgate.

Transmissions
All models include a 6-speed Steptronic automatic transmission.
The new 8-speed transmission is standard in the xDrive50i and xDrive35i from 2011 model year.

Performance

Safety
Winner of Top Safety Pick 2008 by Insurance Institute for Highway Safety.

NHTSA

2010/2011 X5 "Life Cycle Impulse" (LCI) Changes
In 2010 the X5 underwent a "Life Cycle Impulse" (LCI) update, debuted at the New York Auto Show in April 2010 and introduced as 2011 models in BMW North America markets. The changes included revised styling, primarily of the front and rear bumpers, air intakes, headlights, and taillights as well as new exterior and interior colors and new options combination. It also included BMW Group's latest infotainment system. HD Radio, previously an option, was now standard on all X5 models in North America.

More significantly, a new range of engines, all turbocharged and with direct injection was introduced.  In the North American market, available gasoline power trains are the xDrive 35i twin-scroll turbo six-cylinder and the xDrive50i twin turbo V8, both coupled to an eight-speed automatic Steptronic transmission. These petrol engines are more powerful than their predecessors, with the 35i also providing improved fuel mileage and reduced emissions. The xDrive 35d turbodiesel carries over in the NA market with the six-speed transmission unchanged from the previous model year.  The xDrive40d was also introduced along with a revised xDrive30d, but neither was available in the North American market.

The X5M engine and transmission remains the same.

BMW X5 Security Plus
It is a variant with safety glass, heavy-duty material and ballistics-resistant steel modifications. It comes with a 4.8l engine with Steptronic automatic transmission. Armour is rated to safety class VR4 and is configured to carry a roof mounted 7.62mm, AK-47 assault rifle. The vehicle sells for approximately $220,000.

Vision Efficient Dynamics
It was unveiled in 2008 at the Geneva Auto Show.

References

External links

2007 BMW X5 Road Test from Motortrend.com

E70
X5
Cars introduced in 2006
Mid-size sport utility vehicles